Chant II is a 1995 album of Gregorian chant, performed by the Benedictine monks of Santo Domingo de Silos in Burgos, Spain. It is a follow-up to the 1994 release Chant, the best-selling album of Gregorian chant.  Like the first album, it included material which had been recorded by the monks some years previously.

Performers
The monks of Santo Domingo de Silos have been singing Gregorian chant since the 11th century (before that, they used Mozarabic chant). In the nineteenth century the French monks of Solesmes Abbey played a part in the reestablishment of Santo Domingo de Silos after the Ecclesiastical Confiscations of Mendizábal.  The Solesmes style of singing plainsong has influenced the Spanish monks.

Reception

Reviewers had expressed surprise at the success of the first album. Not only had Gregorian chant been a specialist market for record companies before the 1980s but also other choirs were probably technically better in this repertoire (for example the monks of Solesmes issued some notable recordings in the 1960s). However, by the time Chant II was released the monks of Silos had eclipsed their rivals in terms of sales.

AllMusic gave Chant II a poorer rating than the first album, because of inferior sound quality.

Related albums
Chant II was not the first follow-up to Chant, as Chant Noël: Chants For The Holiday Season was released 1 November 1994.
Chant II was followed by Chant III on 17 September 1996.

In 2004, Chant was re-issued along with Chant II as Chant: The Anniversary Edition by Angel/EMI Classics.

Track listing
 "Da Pacem, Domine": Introit
 "Haec Dies Quam Fecit Dominus": Gradual
 "Victimae Paschali Laudes": Sequence
 "Alleluia. Vir Dei Benedictus": Alleluia
 "Kyrie, Fons Bonitatis": Trope
 "Quam Magnificata Sunt Opera Tua Domine": Responsory
 "Ut Queant Laxis Resonare Fibris": Hymn in honour of St John the Baptist
 "Cibavit Eos Ex Adipe Furmenti: Introit"
 "Oculi Omnium In Te Sperant: Gradual"
 "Spirtus Domini Replevit Orbem Terrarum: Introit"
 "Alleluia. Veni Sancte Spiritus: Alleluia"
 "Os Justi Meditabitur Sapientiam: Gradual"
 Kyrie "Lux Et Origo"
 "Gloria In Excelsis Deo"
 "Sanctus Dominus Deus Sabaoth"
 "Agnus Dei, Qui Tollis Peccata Mundi"
 "Ave Mundi Spes Maria: Sequence"
 "Media Vita In Morte Sumus": Responsory
 "Salve, Regina, Mater Misericordiae: Antiphon"

Personnel 
 Jay Barbieri, Art Direction
 Angel Barco, Engineer
 Maria Francisca Bonmati, Producer
 Ismael Fernández de la Cuesta, Conductor
 David Foil, Liner Notes
 Ted Jensen, Mastering
 Marvin Mattelson, Cover Design, Cover Art

References 

1995 classical albums
A cappella albums
Angel Records albums
Benedictine Monks of Santo Domingo de Silos albums